Goodyear (O'odham: Valin Thak) is a city in Maricopa County, Arizona, United States. It is a suburb of Phoenix and at the 2020 census had a population of 95,294, up from 65,275 in 2010 and 18,911 in 2000. It was the third-fastest-growing city in Arizona between 1990 and 2000.

The city is home to the Goodyear Ballpark, where the Cleveland Guardians and Cincinnati Reds of Major League Baseball hold spring training.

In 2008, Goodyear won the All-America City Award, sponsored by the National Civic League. The city is named after the Goodyear Tire and Rubber Company. The company cultivated extensive farmland here to grow cotton for use in its tires.

History
World War II was important to Goodyear in the 1940s as the current Phoenix Goodyear Airport was built, but after the war, the economy suffered. Goodyear became a town on November 19, 1946. At the time, it had 151 homes and 250 apartments, a grocery store, a barber shop, beauty shop and a gas station.

World War II
Luke Field Auxiliary #6 (Goodyear Field) was built by the United States Army Air Forces in 1943. It served as a satellite airfield for Luke Army Air Field (AAF). According to the History of Luke AFB, this airfield boasted the most facilities. It had separate buildings for crew chiefs, operations, supply, barracks, pit latrine, crash truck shed, generator shed and a control tower. Luke AF Auxiliary #6 ceased operations by 1971.

The property, which is in a state of complete abandonment, is owned by the State of Arizona, which has worked with developers on proposals for use.

Modern history
In January 1965, the Phoenix Trotting Park, a harness racing track, opened. The current Interstate 10 passes north of the site. As the region lacked major roads from Phoenix to Goodyear, there was not enough business and the track closed two years later. The park was demolished in 2017.

The town became a city in 1985. In the same decade, the remaining  of the original farmland was sold for future development. The Phoenix Goodyear Airport received its current name in 1986.

Housing and growth

These communities, along with another 21 communities for future suburban development, will contain almost 200,000 homes, with only 25,000 built.

Goodyear was affected by the 2000s American housing bubble, reducing home values. Since then, the housing market has rebounded considerably. According to Opendoor, ZIP code 85338 in Goodyear was the fifth most popular place in the Phoenix metro area to buy a home, based on home sales. There are also a variety of home options in 2019 to accommodate families, those who are single, and seniors. As the population in Goodyear grows faster than ever, home builders and community developers are working quickly to keep up with the demand.

The master-planned community is home to about 10,000 residents. PebbleCreek is a community for active adult living, with 54 holes of championship golf, fitness centers, and restaurants.

From the 1990s through the 2010s, residential development has stimulated the growth of Goodyear as a suburb of Phoenix. Goodyear's population is projected to be 358,000 by 2035.

Geography
Nearby cities include Avondale, Litchfield Park, Tolleson and Buckeye. From the original town center, the Goodyear city limits extend north  to a border with Glendale and south-southeast into the Rainbow Valley  to an area south of Arizona State Route 238.

The Gila River passes through the city. The largest master-planned community is Estrella, south of the Gila River, located near the Estrella Mountains.

The Estrella Mountain Regional Park covers almost , most of which is still desert.

Climate
Goodyear has a hot desert climate (Köppen: BWh) due to its location in the Sonoran Desert. The city receives somewhere around ten inches of rain annually. The city has more than 300 sunny days per year.

Winters are sunny with mild temperatures—nighttime lows averaging between 40 °F and 50 °F (4 °C and 10 °C) and daytime highs ranging from 60 °F to 75 °F (16 °C to 24 °C). The lowest temperature ever recorded in Goodyear is 16 °F (-9 °C). Summers are very hot, with daily high temperatures at or above 100 °F (38 °C) for the entirety of June, July, and August, as well as many days in May and September. An occasional heat wave will spike temperatures over 115 °F (46 °C) briefly. Nighttime lows in the summer months average between 70 °F and 80 °F (21 °C and 27 °C), with an occasional overnight low above 80 °F (27 °C) not uncommon. The highest recorded temperature in Goodyear is 125 °F (52 °C).

Snow is rare in the area, occurring once every several years. Lows in the winter occasionally dip below freezing, which may damage some desert plants such as saguaros and other cacti. In the summer (mainly July, August and early September), the North American Monsoon can hit the Phoenix area in the afternoon and evening (possibly continuing overnight), causing thunderstorms and heavy rain even from a sunny morning. Dust storms are occasional, mainly during the summer.

Demographics

2010 census
As of 2010, the U.S. Census Bureau reported that there were 65,275 people living in the city. 71.9% of the city's population was White, 6.7% were African-American, 1.3% were Native American, and 4.3% were Asian. 27.8% were Hispanic or Latino of any race. There were 25,027 housing units in the city. 31% of the population is between ages 35 and 49.

2000 census
, there were 18,911 people, 6,179 households, and 4,986 families living in the city. There were 6,771 housing units at an average density of 58.1 per square mile (22.4/km2). The racial makeup of the city was 78.1% White, 5.2% African American, 1.1% Native American, 1.7% Asian, 0.1% Pacific Islander, 10.9% from other races, and 3.0% from two or more races.  20.8% of the population were Hispanic or Latino of any race.

There were 6,179 households, out of which 32.7% had children under the age of 18 living with them, 71.1% were married couples living together, 6.4% had a female householder with no husband present, and 19.3% were non-families. 14.1% of all households were made up of individuals, and 3.7% had someone living alone who was 65 years of age or older. The average household size was 2.68 and the average family size was 2.94.

In the city, the population was spread out, with 22.2% under the age of 18, 8.7% from 18 to 24, 34.1% from 25 to 44, 25.1% from 45 to 64, and 9.9% who were 65 years of age or older. The median age was 36 years. For every 100 females, there were 103.7 males. For every 100 females age 18 and over, there were 102.5 males.

The median income for a household in the city was $57,492, and the median income for a family was $60,707. Males had a median income of $40,702 versus $28,410 for females. The per capita income for the city was $22,506. About 3.6% of families and 6.1% of the population were below the poverty line, including 8.7% of those under age 18 and 3.7% of those age 65 or over.

Government and infrastructure
Goodyear has a council-manager form of government. The current Mayor is Joe Pizzillo, a former city councilman who is completing the mayoral term of Georgia Lord, who died in December 2021. Lord was elected to fill a two-year unexpired term as Mayor of the City of Goodyear in March 2011, was re-elected to serve a second term as Mayor in 2013, and was elected to serve her final term in 2017. There are six councilmembers, with three-term limits.

Goodyear City Hall is located at 1900 N. Civic Square. Opening in August 2022, Goodyear City Hall was relocated from its previous location on Litchfield Road. The new city hall complex also houses a new two-story library (Georgia T. Lord Library, named after the late Mayor Lord), two-acre park, office space, as well as space for new restaurants, retail and entertainment. 

The Arizona Department of Corrections operates the Arizona State Prison Complex-Perryville in Goodyear. The prison houses the female death row.

Education
Several school districts serve the city of Goodyear. Elementary school districts include Avondale Elementary School District, Liberty Elementary School District, Litchfield Elementary School District, and Mobile Elementary School District. High school districts include Agua Fria Union High School District and Buckeye Union High School District.

Elementary/middle schools

 Incito Schools
 Mabel Padgett Elementary School
 Palm Valley Elementary School
 Desert Star Elementary School
 Centerra Mirage S.T.E.M Academy
 Copper Trails Elementary School
 Desert Thunder Elementary School
 Estrella Mountain Elementary School K–8
 Las Brisas Academy Elementary School 
 Westar Elementary School
 Western Sky Middle School
 Wildflower Elementary School
 Odyssey Preparatory Academy
 St. John Vianney Catholic School

High schools

 Desert Edge High School
 Millennium High School
 Estrella Foothills High School

Colleges and universities
Franklin Pierce University has had a campus here since 2008, when the New Hampshire-based university signed a lease with the city to purchase  of land. It offers a Doctor of Physical Therapy program and other healthcare-related programs.

Sports

Goodyear is known as a site for professional baseball teams' spring training sessions. The Cleveland Guardians of Major League Baseball's American League moved their spring training facility to Goodyear from Winter Haven, Florida and rejoined the Cactus League in February 2009, after a 15-year absence. Before that, the Guardians (then known as the Indians) held spring training for many years in Tucson.

On April 7, 2008, Goodyear's city council unanimously approved a memorandum to fund a new $33 million baseball spring training complex for Major League Baseball's Cincinnati Reds and Cleveland Guardians. This includes a 10,000-seat park, Goodyear Ballpark, that opened in 2009. The Reds and the Guardians have separate offices, clubhouses and practice fields. The Guardians had held their spring training in Tucson for many years until moving to Winter Haven in 1993. They agreed in 2006 to return their spring training location to Arizona at Goodyear.

The Goodyear Centennials, of the Freedom Pro Baseball League, played their home games at the Goodyear Ballpark. Two other baseball teams in the Arizona Complex League, the Arizona Complex League Guardians and the Arizona Complex League Reds, also play at the stadium.

Transportation

Air
Phoenix Goodyear Airport is located here. It has an  runway capable of handling large jet aircraft. This airport, used by many international airlines for aircraft maintenance and storage, has no active commercial air service.

Rail
Union Pacific operates a railroad that goes through Goodyear. Rail lines provide Goodyear with access to 23 states in the western two-thirds of the United States.

Road transport
Interstate 10 passes through Goodyear, heading west to Buckeye and Los Angeles. I-10 heads east to Phoenix, Tucson, and the Southern states.

The city is also served by the western ends of several bus routes of the Valley Metro Bus.

Other roads and highways serve the area. Loop 303 starts as Cotton Lane then heads up north to Surprise and then to Interstate 17. Van Buren Street and McDowell, Indian School and Camelback Roads are major arterial roads leading from the extreme western Phoenix area to past Scottsdale in the east. MC 85 (Maricopa County Highway 85) is a highway running from Arizona State Route 85 in Buckeye to Loop 202 in Phoenix. The highway passes the southern sections of Goodyear.

Road improvements
Interstate 10 was built through Goodyear in the late 20th century. Between 2008 and 2014, the road had significant expansions. It was expanded from two lanes in each direction to five or six (including one HOV lane starting near Loop 303 going east). There were also new interchanges, including Exit 122 (Perryville Road), Exit 123 (Citrus Road) and Exit 125 (Sarival Avenue).

Loop 303 improvement
The Arizona Department of Transportation built a new interchange near the Interstate 10/Loop 303 junctions. The interchange is being expanded from a diamond interchange to a stack interchange. As a result, Loop 303 under Interstate 10 was cleared, and Exit 124 on Interstate 10 has been shut down; the new interchange was completed in 2014.

South of Interstate 10, Loop 303 is being planned to extend to a future State Route 30. Loop 303 will go south of future State Route 30 to Estrella Mountain Ranch and to Interstate 8 near Mobile, Arizona.

State Route 30 (formerly State Route 801)
Arizona State Route 30 (originally designated as State Route 801) is a proposed highway south of Interstate 10 that will relieve traffic congestion. It is planned to run between Arizona State Route 85 to Interstate 17.

Galleries
This gallery includes photos of the following:
 The Litchfield Train Station – built in 1920 to serve the town of Litchfield Park and sold to the City of Goodyear for $5,000 in 2009. The station, which once was located near Maricopa County 85 and Litchfield Road, was moved to the city waterworks land, where it currently lies in a total state of abandonment and deterioration.
 Phoenix Trotting Park,  a horse racing track built in 1964. It opened in 1965 and was run for about two and a half seasons. The property sat abandoned since its closure and was demolished in 2017.
 A Goodyear-Wingfoot house – located in Greenleaf Lane in the town of Goodyear, was built by a Southwest Cotton factory at Litchfield Airport in 1943. Called the "home of the future," the Wingfoot Houses were 8 feet wide. Once on site, the bedroom wings were pulled out like drawers to yield a "T"-shaped, flat-roofed house. It had  of living area.

Lake Field gallery

Notable people
 Carrick Felix, former Arizona State Sun Devils men's basketball and current Cleveland Cavaliers player
 Hersey Hawkins, former NBA player. Moved to Estrella, Goodyear and served as an assistant coach for the varsity basketball team at Estrella Foothills High School.
 Gilbert Levin, scientist and developer of one of the life on Mars experiments, as part of the Viking program. Owned a winter home in Estrella, Goodyear.
 Rick Manning, former MLB player and current baseball broadcaster
 Tim Raines, MLB Hall of Famer and resident of Estrella, Goodyear
 Josh Rojas, professional baseball player and alumnus of Millennium High School (Arizona). 
 Mitchell Watt, former Buffalo Bulls basketball player from Desert Edge High School

References

External links
 
 

 
Cities in Arizona
Cities in Maricopa County, Arizona
Goodyear Tire and Rubber Company
Company towns in Arizona
Populated places established in 1917
Phoenix metropolitan area
Populated places in the Sonoran Desert
1917 establishments in Arizona